Cristian Ruata (born 26 January 1972) is a Guatemalan windsurfer. He competed in the men's Mistral One Design event at the 1996 Summer Olympics.

References

External links
 
 

1972 births
Living people
Guatemalan windsurfers
Guatemalan male sailors (sport)
Olympic sailors of Guatemala
Sailors at the 1996 Summer Olympics – Mistral One Design
Place of birth missing (living people)